Makseh,  is a village located in the Zahlé District of the Beqaa Governorate in Lebanon.

History
In 1838, Eli Smith noted Mekseh's population being Sunni Muslim and Maronite.

References

Bibliography

External links
Makseh, localiban

Populated places in Zahlé District